Henry Clare Cox (25 September 1884 – 22 August 1946) was an Australian rules footballer who played with Melbourne in the Victorian Football League (VFL).

Notes

External links 

1884 births
Australian rules footballers from Victoria (Australia)
Melbourne Football Club players
Australian military personnel of World War I
1946 deaths